This is a list of festivals in Ottawa, Ontario, Canada. This list includes festivals of diverse types, such as regional festivals, commerce festivals, fairs, food festivals, arts festivals, religious festivals, folk festivals, and recurring festivals on holidays.  The city hosts several large festivals each year, including North America's largest country music festival, Canada's largest and North America's second largest blues festival, and the world's largest hockey tournament.

Festivals
Canada Dance Festival
Canadian Stone Carving Festival
Canadian Tulip Festival
Capital Hoedown
Capital Idea!
Capital Pride
Festival Franco-ontarien
Latin Sparks Festival 
Lumière Festival
Ottawa Burlesque Festival
Ottawa Dragon Boat Race Festival
Ottawa Fringe Festival
Ottawa International Buskerfest
Ottawa International Children's Festival
Ottawa International Hockey Festival
Ottawa International Writers Festival
Ottawa StoryTellers
Ottawa SuperEX
Rideau Canal Festival
Westfest
Winterlude

Cultural festivals
Capital Ukrainian Festival
Carnival of Cultures
European Festival
the Great India Festival
Irish Film Festival Ottawa
Ottawa Greek Festival
Ottawa Lebanese Festival
Ottawa Italian Week Festival
Palestinian Festival Ottawa

Film & stage festivals
Asinabka Film and Media Arts Festival
European Union Film Festival
Inside Out Film and Video Festival
Irish Film Festival Ottawa
Latin American Film Festival
One World Film Festival
Ottawa International Animation Festival
Ottawa International Film Festival
Ottawa Canadian Film Festival

Food & beverage festivals
 Ottawa Poutine Festival
Ottawa Ribfest
Ottawa Wine and Food Festival
Winter Brewfest
Orléans Craft Beer Festival
Ottawa Beer Fest

Music festivals
CityFolk Festival
Escapade Music Festival
Music and Beyond
O-Town Hoedown
Ottawa Bluesfest
Ottawa Busker Festival
Ottawa Chamberfest
Ottawa International Jazz Festival
Ottawa Reggae Festival
Riverside Festival

Pop culture festivals
Ottawa Comiccon
Ottawa Pop Expo

Gallery

See also

List of festivals in Ontario
List of festivals in Canada 
List of attractions in Ottawa

External links

and
Ottawa